Eupromera gilmouri is a species of beetle in the family Cerambycidae. It was described by Ernst Fuchs in 1961. It is known from Brazil.

References

Eupromerini
Beetles described in 1961